Justin Sofio (born April 15, 1979) is an American racing driver from Arleta, California.

Justin Sofio won two races with Binder Racing in his first two professional starts as a rookie.  Both victories were on the streets of Long Beach in the Toyota Atlantic Championship (C2).  He then formed Mathiasen Motorsports and competed in eight more races in 2005 winning six of those races, with a second and a fourth. This clinched the championship with seven wins in a best of seven series earning himself the Toyota Atlantic Yokohama Tire Cup (C2) Championship by San Jose California with 2 races left on the schedule.  A best career Toyota Atlantic overall finish of 5th at Long Beach in 2005.  Sofio finished 13th in the Champ Car Atlantic Championship powered by Mazda in 2006 and 11th in the championship in 2007.

Sofio also received the Champ Car Atlantic Jovy Marcello award for sportsmanship in 2007.

Scoring Starts : 34
Wins : 8 Toyota Atlantic (C2)
Podiums : 0
Top 5 : 1
Top 10 : 14
Best finish : 5
Average finish : 13.3
Career overall average finish 13.3

References 

1979 births
Living people
American racing drivers
Atlantic Championship drivers
Sportspeople from Los Angeles County, California
Racing drivers from California
Racing drivers from Los Angeles